Shopnopuri Artificial Amusement Park is an artificial spot for tourists situated in Dinajpur district of Rangpur division in Bangladesh. There are rides, a artificial & a mini zoo, few rest-house, many garden, lakes, central picnic center and countless shopping areas. Other tourist locations include Fish World, ‘Rongdhonu’ Art Gallery, and ‘Moha Maya Indrojal’. Fish World offers artificial fishes and various wet animals. The Animal Kingdom is filled with artificial statues of some animals like flamingos, dinosaurs, Pegasus and many more. ‘Rongdhonu’ Art Gallery has a variety of sculptures and paintings. At ‘Moha Maya Indrojal’, there is magic. And there is a variety of animals. It is a popular site for picnics.

Artistic sculpture
An artificial lake
A sculpture of Rabindra NathThagore
Sculpture of a fairy
Sculpture of a dinosaur
Statue of the National flag, a poet, fruit and bird.

Location

Aftabgonj, Nawabgonj Upzilla, Dinajpur, Rangpur.

References

Parks in Bangladesh